The Hole in the Ground is a 2019 supernatural horror film, directed by Lee Cronin in his feature debut film, from a screenplay by Cronin and Stephen Shields. It stars Seána Kerslake, James Cosmo, Kati Outinen, Simone Kirby, Steve Wall, and James Quinn Markey. It follows a young woman who begins to suspect that her son's disturbing behavior is linked to a mysterious sinkhole.

The film had its world premiere at the Sundance Film Festival on 25 January 2019. It was released on 1 March 2019 by Wildcard Distribution in Ireland and by Vertigo Releasing in the United Kingdom.

Plot

Sarah O’Neill and her son Christopher ("Chris") move to the Irish countryside to start a new life in a rented house next to an old forest, after leaving Chris's father. Sarah worries about Chris's lack of interest in making new friends, but doesn't push the matter. While driving, Sarah almost hits an old woman named Noreen Brady standing in the middle of the road, causing the car's sideview mirror to break and fall off. When she exits the car to retrieve the mirror, Sarah notices Noreen whispering to herself before she turns to stare at Chris in silence.

After returning home, Chris becomes frightened by a spider and Sarah catches it in a jar. Outside, Chris asks her why they came here without his father, and says that his father would have killed the spider instead of releasing it. An upset Sarah releases the spider from the jar and Chris stomps on it before running away from her and into the forest. Sarah follows Chris, but is unable to catch him. She starts to get worried and eventually comes upon a large sinkhole in the middle of the forest. Believing that her son might be hurt, she turns around in a panic and discovers Chris standing behind her. Chris hasn’t seen the sinkhole yet and asks what’s behind her.

At a dinner party with friends that evening, Sarah discovers that one of her friends was in the same class with Noreen's son James when the pair were children. Her friend says that Noreen once burst into the classroom screaming before being restrained and taken to the principal's office before the police arrived. Her friend claims, James was consequently taken out of school and murdered by Noreen after she ran him over with her car.

Later that night, Sarah awakens to sounds downstairs. She finds Chris missing from his bedroom. She discovers that the door is open, and flees into the forest, believing Chris has run away. She searches in the dark for some time but cannot find Chris. After returning home, she calls the police, only to discover Chris standing in the doorway of his bedroom. Sarah visits a doctor the next day and is prescribed sedatives.

While driving Chris home from school, Sarah comes across Noreen, who is standing in the middle of the road again. Sarah exits the car and asks her to move, before meeting Noreen's kind husband Des. The two talk, while Noreen approaches the car. She notices Chris and becomes enraged, screaming that he is not Sarah's son while hitting the window with her head. Des pulls her away, and Sarah drives home in shock.

Sarah visits the Bradys’ house the day after, and discovers Noreen has been mysteriously murdered in a gruesome way, having her head buried in the dirt. Sarah attends Noreen's funeral, and notices that all the mirrors in Noreen’s house are covered with black cloths.  Des explains to Sarah that Noreen believed their son James was an imposter; she could apparently tell by looking at James’s reflection in a mirror, and the habit soon became an obsession. Sarah asks what happened to James, and Des reveals that it was him, not his wife, who didn't see James dart into the road and hit him with his car.

Sarah and Chris's relationship begins to fracture; Chris suddenly develops a fondness for spaghetti bolognese and parmesan cheese, a dish he previously hated, and when Sarah confronts him about finding his toy soldier in the forest during a run, he grows enraged and pushes the dinner table towards her in an uncharacteristic display of strength. Chris suddenly becomes friends with his schoolmates, and plans to join the talent show. Sarah hears strange noises whilst bathing one night and later observes Chris catching and eating spiders in his bedroom. The next day, she visits the doctor who tells her that everything is normal. Despite this, she is convinced Chris isn't himself.

Sarah and Chris sit down for breakfast after she finishes the task of wallpapering the house. While Chris is eating, Sarah tells him that she loves him, and Chris begins to touch her face. When his fingers touch the scar on her forehead, he suddenly digs them into her skin. Sarah wakes up, and realises it was a nightmare. She watches Chris perform in the school talent show. During his verse, Chris zones in on Sarah and begins to speak his lines in an emotionless voice. Sarah then flees from the hall, and later from Chris when he is walked back to her by a teacher.

Sarah hides a camera in her son's room in an effort to monitor Chris' nighttime behavior, and after watching the footage she becomes more convinced than ever that he is not her real son. She takes the camera over to Des’s house to show him the evidence. However, after Des watches the video, he becomes enraged and throws the camera at the floor. Confronting him, Sarah asks Des to tell her if he truly doesn't believe her, to which Des replies that he can't.

Eventually, Sarah ascertains that Chris is a shapeshifter. While the creature watches television, she says they're going to play one of their favourite games - in which Sarah counts to three, and then they both pull faces. But after she counts, the creature just stares at her blankly. Sarah then tells him that he is not her son while being backed into the kitchen by the creature. The creature snaps, and begins to throw her across the kitchen repeatedly.

An injured Sarah later wakes in the garden, where the creature is shown digging a hole, before he drags her over and begins to bury her headfirst, in the same manner as Noreen. He then falls asleep (having been drugged by Sarah, with the medication she got from the doctor) and Sarah frees herself. She drags the creature to the house's basement and finds the broken car mirror. Placing it to the side of the creature’s face, he is revealed to be a shapeshifter. He begins to revive and after a minor scuffle, Sarah locks him in the basement and flees to the forest's sinkhole.

Sarah goes to the bottom of the sinkhole, crawls in underground tunnels in the earth, and eventually finds a child that looks like Chris still alive, buried deep in the ground among dozens of formless and faceless creatures. As the two escape, she is followed by a grotesque formless shapeshifter. As they reach the end of the tunnel, Sarah sees the creature’s hand on her wrist and frantically hits it with her torch. The hand suddenly turns to human flesh, and Sarah shines the light down the tunnel to see that the monster has taken her form. Sarah and Chris return to the house, and Sarah enters to retrieve the car keys before setting the house on fire with the changeling that was Chris still inside. She and the real Chris drive away to start a new life back in the city; Sarah begins to attend university, and Chris happily settles into their new house.

One day, while Chris is playing on his bike outside, Sarah takes some pictures of him through the window. Viewing the pictures, she sees that Chris's face is very blurry compared to the rest of the image. The final shot shows that Sarah has covered the walls of the living room in mirrors.

Cast
 Seána Kerslake as Sarah O'Neill
 James Cosmo as Des Brady
 Kati Outinen as Noreen Brady
 Simone Kirby as Louise Caul
 Steve Wall as Rob Caul
 James Quinn Markey as Chris O'Neill
 Eoin Macken as Jay Caul
 David Crowley as Teacher 1

Release
In December 2018, A24 and DirecTV Cinema acquired U.S. distribution rights to the film. The same month, Vertigo Releasing acquired U.K. and Irish distribution rights. The film had its world premiere at the Sundance Film Festival on 25 January 2019, and was theatrically released in Ireland and the United States on 1 March 2019.

Reception

Box office
The Hole in the Ground grossed a total worldwide of $3.4 million, with $21,072 in North America.

Critical response

On review aggregator Rotten Tomatoes, the film holds an approval rating of 83% based on 89 reviews, with an average rating of 6.3/10. The website's critical consensus reads, "The Hole in the Ground artfully exploits parental fears with a well-made horror outing that makes up in sheer effectiveness what it lacks in originality." On Metacritic, the film has a weighted average score of 63 out of 100, based on 16 critics, indicating "generally positive reviews."

References

External links
 
 

2019 independent films
2010s psychological horror films
2010s supernatural horror films
2019 films
2019 directorial debut films
2019 horror films
Folk horror films
A24 (company) films
English-language Irish films
English-language Belgian films
English-language Finnish films
Belgian horror films
British psychological horror films
British independent films
Films about children
Films about parenting
Films set in Ireland
Finnish horror films
Irish supernatural horror films
Irish independent films
British supernatural horror films
Belgian independent films
Works by Lee Cronin
2010s English-language films
2010s American films
2010s British films